Capitol Cinema is one of the Mumbai's oldest theatres. Located just opposite Chhatrapati Shivaji Maharaj Terminus, it was built by Kunvarji Paghtivala. It is a Heritage grade II  Victorian structure constructed in 1879. Originally a theatre for performing arts known as Tivoli it got its present name in 1928 when it was converted to a Movie theatre.
Prior to its renaming to Capitol, it was known as Gaiety Theatre.

References

Cinemas in Mumbai
Theatres completed in 1879
Victorian architecture